Jovana Stojiljković (born 19 March 1992) is a Serbian stage and film actress. She is best known for her performance as Sofija in the TV series South Wind.

Selected filmography

References

External links 

1992 births
Living people
Actresses from Belgrade
Serbian film actresses
21st-century Serbian actresses